Annie Xu (born October 22, 1999) is an American badminton player who competes in international elite events. She is a double Pan Am Junior champion and a Summer Universiade bronze medalist alongside her twin sister Kerry Xu.

Achievements

Summer Universiade 
Women's doubles

Pan Am Junior Championships 
Girls' singles

Girls' doubles

Mixed doubles

BWF International Challenge/Series 
Women's doubles

  BWF International Challenge tournament
  BWF International Series tournament
  BWF Future Series tournament

References

1999 births
Living people
Sportspeople from San Jose, California
American female badminton players
Competitors at the 2017 Summer Universiade
Medalists at the 2017 Summer Universiade
Twin sportspeople
21st-century American women